Methyltransferase-like protein 2B is an enzyme that in humans is encoded by the METTL2B gene.

This gene is a member of a family of methyltransferases that share homology with, but are distinct from, the UbiE family of methyltransferases. Alternatively spliced variants which encode different protein isoforms have been described; however, not all variants have been fully characterized.

References

Further reading